Thomas Cornwallis (c. 1605–1675) was an English politician and colonial administrator. Cornwallis served as one of the first Commissioners of the Province of Maryland (Proprietary Colony of Maryland), and Captain of the colony's military during the early years of settlement. In a 1638 naval engagement with Virginian colonists, he captured Kent Island in Maryland.

Life
Thomas was related to Sir Charles Cornwallis of Beeston, Norfolk (d. 1629), who was an ambassador to Spain and the brother of both Elizabeth Cornwallis and Sir William Cornwallis of Brome. Sir William was the direct ancestor of Charles Cornwallis, 1st Marquess Cornwallis. Thomas was probably the son (or the brother) of the author William Cornwallis.

As the second son, he did not hope to inherit his father's land. The Cornwallis family were Roman Catholic Recusants, and therefore, George Calvert's project of an autonomous colony in the New World of English Catholics appealed to Thomas. In 1634, he accompanied Leonard Calvert to what was then Virginia, and became a Commissioner to the Governor. This put him in a powerful advisory position to Leonard Calvert. In 1635, Cornwallis fought the Virginian colonist William Claiborne over the jurisdiction of Kent Island, and captured it in 1638. In 1643, he defended the colony against a Native American attack.

In 1644, Richard Ingle sailed into Chesapeake Bay with his ship, Reformation, and fired on St. Mary's City. Cornwallis' land was occupied and many of the buildings he had constructed were destroyed. As a result of these losses and his loss of influence in the colony, Cornwallis returned to England, where he died at some point after 4 March 1675. The tombs of Cornwallis and his wife Penelope are inside St. Mary's Church in Erwarton.

Thomas Cornwallis sailed with Lord Leonard Calvert from England to Maryland, not Virginia, as one of the original Commissioners of the colony. King Charles I signed the charter of Maryland in 1635, making George Calvert and his heirs Proprietors of Maryland. It was George Calvert's son, Cecil Calvert, who signed the charter, second Lord Baltimore, and received the province of Maryland from King Charles I. However, the English civil war between Parliament and Charles I, left the possession of the Maryland Province in question. Kent Island was part of the land owned by one William Claiborne of Virginia. He resented that his land had been included in the grant to Lord Baltimore and refused to submit to Maryland's Authority. Cornwallis was involved in several Naval battles over Kent Island in 1635, and in 1638, he led an expedition that took control of the island for the Calvert family.

Notes

People of colonial Maryland
1605 births
1675 deaths
People from Norfolk